Marius Kižys (born 21 February 1982) is a professional Lithuanian footballer. He is currently playing for Vang Tvorup IF. Previously he has played for FBK Kaunas, FK Šilutė, ŁKS Łódź and Scottish Premier League side Heart of Midlothian.

External links
 

1982 births
Living people
Lithuanian footballers
FK Žalgiris players
FBK Kaunas footballers
Heart of Midlothian F.C. players
ŁKS Łódź players
Górnik Zabrze players
Scottish Premier League players
Lithuanian expatriate footballers
Expatriate footballers in Scotland
Expatriate footballers in Poland
Lithuanian expatriate sportspeople in Poland
Expatriate footballers in Russia
People from Tauragė
FC Nizhny Novgorod (2007) players
Sportspeople from Kretinga
Association football midfielders